Canna paniculata Ruiz & Pav. is a species of the Canna genus, belonging to the family Cannaceae. Native of southern Mexico, Costa Rica, and tropical South America, except for the Amazon Basin, at 200-2,000m (650-6,500 ft).

It is a perennial growing to 5 m (16 ft) tall. It is hardy to zone 10 and is frost tender. In the north latitudes it is in flower from August to October, and the seeds ripen in October. The flowers are hermaphrodite.

In addition to the above generally agreed synonyms, there is a major reference (1) to Canna 'Musaefolia', admitting that it was earlier called C. excelsa Lodd., but renamed in France by Monsieur Theodoré Anneé because of its resemblance to Musa.

Taxonomy
In the last three decades of the 20th century, Canna species have been categorised by two different taxonomists, Paulus Johannes Maria Maas from the Netherlands and Nobuyuki Tanaka from Japan, and they are in agreement that this is a distinct and separate species.

Canna paniculata  grows to 5 m (16 ft) tall. Leaves green, sessile or shortly but distinctly petiolate, petiole with pulvinus, lower side, lower side of leaves mostly lanuginose. Inflorescence often branched. Flowers erect, red to yellow or scarlet, 6–10 cm (2½-4in) long, composed of 6 coloured parts of about equal length; petals not reflexed; staminode one.

References

 
 Cooke, Ian, 2001. The Gardener's Guide to Growing cannas, Timber Press. 
 Johnson's Gardeners Dictionary, 1856
 Tanaka, N. 2001. Taxonomic revision of the family Cannaceae in the New World and Asia. Makinoa ser. 2, 1:34–43.

External links
 Kew Gardens, Checklist of plant families

paniculata
Flora of Mexico
Flora of Costa Rica
Flora of South America